The Air Force Falcons football team competes in the National Collegiate Athletic Association (NCAA) Division I Football Bowl Subdivision, representing the United States Air Force Academy. Since 1999, the Falcons have competed as a charter member of the Mountain West Conference. Following the split of the Mountain West Conference into two divisions in 2013, the Falcons play in the "Mountain Division".

Seasons

References

Air Force Falcons

Air Force Falcons football